Hostal Royal Manzanares is a Spanish comedy television series starring Lina Morgan. It aired from 1996 to 1998 on TVE1.

Premise 
Reme, a small-town woman, arrives to Madrid together with her father Paciano and her hen Cristal and stay at the hostel owned by Asunción, Reme's aunt.

Cast 
 Lina Morgan as Reme, a small-town woman who has just arrived to Madrid with her father and her hen, Cristal.
 Mary Begoña as Asunción, the owner of the guesthouse, Reme's aunt.
 Rafael Alonso as Paciano, Reme's father.
 Ana Obregón as Sonsy, a prostitute with a heart of gold.
  as Luis, Reme's main love interest.
  as Elena, Asunción's daughter and Reme's cousin.
  as Filo, a client of the guesthouse.
 Lolita Flores as Juncal, a kleptomaniac gypsy woman, who just left prison.
  as Junior, a well-off man.

Production and release 
Produced by Valerio Lazarov's company Prime Time and directed by Sebastián Junyent, the series was filmed in presence of a studio audience. Just like some other comedy series of the time, it was based on an "inoffensive and banal" brand of humour driven by the histrionism of the characters. It premiered on 15 February 1996, drawing 8,491,000 viewers (a 46.01 % share). The series dominated the prime time for the rest of its broadcasting run, with audience peaking on 15 May 1996 at 8,675,000 viewers and a 50.6 % share. The series finale aired on 25 December 1997, yet a special episode of compilatory nature aired in January 1998.

References 

1996 Spanish television series debuts
1998 Spanish television series debuts
1990s Spanish comedy television series
Television shows set in Madrid
La 1 (Spanish TV channel) network series
Spanish-language television shows